Under the Glacier is a 1989 Icelandic drama film directed by Guðný Halldórsdóttir, based on her father's novel. The film was selected as the Icelandic entry for the Best Foreign Language Film at the 62nd Academy Awards, but was not accepted as a nominee.

Cast
 Sigurður Sigurjónsson as Umbi
 Baldvin Halldórsson as Séra Jón Prímus
 Margrét Helga Jóhannsdóttir as Úa
 Kristbjörg Kjeld as Hnallflóra
 Helgi Skúlason as Godman Sý ngmann
 Þórhallur Sigurðsson as Jódínus Álfberg
 Rúrik Haraldsson as Tumi Jónsen
 Ívar DeCarsta Webster as James Butler

See also
 List of submissions to the 62nd Academy Awards for Best Foreign Language Film
 List of Icelandic submissions for the Academy Award for Best Foreign Language Film

References

External links
 

1989 films
1989 drama films
Halldór Laxness
1980s Icelandic-language films
Films directed by Guðný Halldórsdóttir
Icelandic drama films
Films based on Icelandic novels